Novo Horizonte do Sul is a municipality located in the Brazilian state of Mato Grosso do Sul. Its population was 3,684 (2020) and its area is 849 km².

References

Municipalities in Mato Grosso do Sul